Middlesex Cricket Board played in List A cricket matches between 1999 and 2002. This is a list of the players who appeared in those matches.

Richard Barlow (2001): RGR Barlow
Ian Boyton (2001): IJ Boyton
Christopher Coleman (2002): CP Coleman
Mark Crawley (1999): MA Crawley
Matthew Creese (2001–2002): ML Creese
Paul Dancy (2001): PAJ Dancy
Ricky Fay (2000): RA Fay
Alastair Fraser (1999–2002): AGJ Fraser
Chris Goldie (2001): CFE Goldie
Tom Harrison (1999–2000): TW Harrison
Vernon Hill (2001): EV Hill
Craig Jones (2002): CMP Jones
Robin Jones (1999–2000): RO Jones
Mark Lowrey (1999): MJ Lowrey
Kervin Marc (2000): K Marc
John Maunders (2001): JK Maunders
Brad McNamara (1999): BE McNamara
Nadeem Mohammed (1999): N Mohammed
Robert Nelson (2000–2002): RD Nelson
Luke O'Reilly (2001): LJ O'Reilly
Chetan Patel (1999): CM Patel
Sachin Patel (2002): S Patel
Chris Peploe (2001): CT Peploe
Kirk Powell (2001–2002): KHA Powell
Stephen Price (2001–2002): SJ Price
Keerthi Ranasinghe (2000–2002): SK Ranasinghe
Rajesh Rao (2000–2002): RK Rao
Carlos Remy (2000–2001): CC Remy
James Rodham (2002): JP Rodham
Neil Sargeant (2000): NF Sargeant
Ben Scott (1999): BJM Scott
Tom Simpson (2000): TA Simpson
Paul Smith (2002): PC Smith
Luke Stoughton (20010: LRF Stoughton
Chris Tetley (2001): CMB Tetley
Simon Weale (1999): SD Weale
Peter Wellings (2001–2002): PE Wellings
Mark Wright (2001): MJW Wright
David Young (2002): DJ Young

References

Middlesex Cricket Board